Mallos pearcei is a species of mesh web weavers in the family Dictynidae. It is found in the USA.

References

 Bradley, Richard A. (2012). Common Spiders of North America. University of California Press.
 Ubick, Darrell (2005). Spiders of North America: An Identification Manual. American Arachnological Society.

Dictynidae
Spiders described in 1958